Myophiomys is an extinct species of rodent from Africa.

Sources

 Lavocat, R. 1973. Les rongeurs du Miocčne d’Afrique Orientale. Memoires et travaux Ecole Pratique des Hautes Etudes, Institut Montpellier, 1:1-284.

Miocene mammals of Africa
Myophiomyidae
Miocene rodents
Fossil taxa described in 1973
Prehistoric rodent genera